Darko Baljak (born 29 July 1983) is a Serbian football manager and former player.

Playing career
After starting out at Srem, Baljak made his Serbian SuperLiga debut with Banat Zrenjanin in 2007. He also briefly played for Icelandic club Fjölnir in 2013.

Managerial career
Baljak started his managerial career at Radnički Sremska Mitrovica. He later served as manager of Sloga Erdevik between November 2019 and April 2022.

References

External links
 
 

1983 births
Living people
Sportspeople from Sremska Mitrovica
Serbia and Montenegro footballers
Serbian footballers
Association football midfielders
FK Srem players
FK Banat Zrenjanin players
RFK Novi Sad 1921 players
FK Radnički Šid players
FK Radnički Sremska Mitrovica players
Second League of Serbia and Montenegro players
Serbian First League players
Serbian SuperLiga players
Serbian expatriate footballers
Expatriate footballers in Iceland
Serbian expatriate sportspeople in Iceland
Serbian football managers